This is a list of compositions by Johanna Senfter.

Piano

Piano Solo
8 Stücke, Op. 29
4 Stücke, Op. 45
3 Stücke, Op. 59
3 klavierstücke, Op. 77
3 klavierstücke, Op. 83
klavierstücke, Op. 113
Veränderungen, Op. 118
3 Stücke, Op. 122
2 klavierstücke, Op. 129
Six easy pieces for beginners
Mazurka in F Minor
Scherzo in D Minor
Klavierstudie
Passacaglia #5 in F Major
Passacaglia #7 in G Minor
Passacaglia #8 in h Minor
Berceuse in E Major
Vogelweise in G Minor
8 Passacaglien
Fugue #4
Fugue #5
Fugue #7
7 fugen

Two Pianos
Passacaglia for two pianos, Op. 14
Sonata for two pianos, Op. 39
Tonstücke in A Minor for two pianos, Op. 109

Piano, Four Hands
7 Waltzer for Piano Four Hands

Organ
Fantasie und Fugue, Op. 30a
7 Choral Preludes, Op. 30b
Variations on ‘Morgenglanz der Ewigheit’ for Organ, Op. 66
10 Choral Pieces, Op. 70
6 Choral Preludes, Op. 73

Instrument solo
Violin Sonata in G Minor, Op. 61
Violin Sonata
2 sonatas for Violin solo

Chamber music

Violin and Piano
Romance and Allegro for Violin and Piano, Op. 3a
Violin Sonata in G Major, Op. 6
6 little pieces for Violin and Piano, Op. 13
Violin Sonata in D Minor, Op. 17
Violin Sonata in A Major, Op. 26
Violin Sonata in G Minor, Op. 32
Violin Sonata in D Major, Op. 68
Violin Sonata in C Major, Op. 80
Veränderungen for Violin and Piano, Op. 94
Five pieces for Violin and Piano, Op. 100
Violin Sonata in F Major, Op.108
Kleine Sonata for Violin and Piano, Op. 133

Cello and Piano
Andante and Scherzo for Cello and Piano, Op. 3b
Cello Sonata in A Major, Op. 10
3 älte tänze for Cello and Piano, Op. 25
Cello Sonata in E Major, Op. 79

Clarinet and Piano
Sonata for Clarinet and Piano in A Major, Op. 57

Viola and Piano
Viola Sonata in F Minor, Op. 41
Veränderungen, Op. 94
Viola Sonata in F Major, Op. 101
Duo for Viola and Piano, Op. 127
Five Pieces, without opus number

Organ and Violin
Little Sonata for Organ and Violin, Op. 75

Organ and Viola
6 Pieces for Organ and Viola, Op. 76

Violin and Viola
Duo for Violin and Viola, Op. 58
Kleine Duo for Violin and Viola, Op. 116

Two violins
10 alte tänze for two Violins, Op. 91

Piano Trio
Piano Trio, Op. 21
Piano Trio, Op. 47
Piano Trio, Op. 54
Trio for Piano, Violin and Viola, Op. 96
Piano Trio, Op. 134
Piano Trio

Piano Quartet
Piano Quartet in E Minor, Op. 11
Piano Quartet in D Minor, Op. 112

String Quartet
String Quartet in D Minor, Op. 4
String Quartet in F Minor, Op 28
String Quartet in F Minor, Op. 46
Variations for String Quartet in D Major, Op. 63
String Quartet in B Major, Op. 64
String Quartet in C Minor, Op. 115

Other
Tonstück for 8 winds instruments in E Major, Op. 60
Trio for Piano, Horn and Clarinet, Op. 103
Two pieces for Violin, Viola, Cello and Harp, Op. 111
Quinet for Clarinet and String Quartet in B♭ Major, Op. 119

Orchestral

Symphonies
Symphony #1 in F Major, Op. 22
Symphony #2 in D Minor, Op. 27
Symphony #3 in A Major, Op. 43
Symphony #4 in B Major, Op. 50
Symphony #5 in E Minor, Op. 67
Symphony #6 in E Major, Op. 74
Symphony #7 in F Minor, Op. 84
Symphony #8 in E Minor, Op. 107

Symphonic Poems
Tonstück for Orchestra, Op. 102
Folge von heiteren stücke for Orchestra, Op. 130

Piano and Orchestra
Piano Concerto in G Minor, Op. 90

Violin and Orchestra
Violin Concerto in E Minor, Op. 1
Violin Concerto in D Minor, Op. 35
Violin Concerto in B Minor, Op. 71
2 Vortragstücken for Violin and Orchestra

Viola da Gamba and Orchestra
Gamba Concerto in B Minor, Op. 105

Viola and Orchestra
Viola Concerto in C Minor, Op. 121

Other
Suite for Orchestra in D Major, Op. 2
Suite for Orchestra in C Minor, Op. 5
Variations for Orchestra, Op. 9
3 Gesänge for Orchestra, Op. 24
Concerto for two Violins and String Orchestra, Op. 40
5 kleine Tänze for Orchestra, Op. 81

Choral
2 Chorals, Op. 16
Die nacht ist vorgerückt, Op. 18a
Gebet, Op. 19
Weihnachtskantilene, Op. 31
Heilige Nächte, Op. 36
Ein Traum, Op. 55
Das Licht scheint, Op. 62
Chor der Töten, Op. 114

Lieder
8 Lieder, Op. 8a
8 Lieder, Op. 8b
6 Lieder, Op. 15
Abschied, Op. 20
Wenn der Herr, Op. 33a
Zur Ruh, zur Ruh ihr Müden Glieder, Op. 34/2
Maria und der Schiffer, Op. 34a
3 Lieder, Op. 42
3 Gesänge, Op. 49
Maria vor dem Kreuze, Op. 51
4 Lieder, Op. 53
3 Gesänge, Op. 56b
6 Lieder, Op. 65
3 Gesänge, Op. 72
Unsterblich, Op. 78
6 Lieder, Op. 82
4 Gesänge, Op. 86
5 Lieder, Op. 88
3 Lieder, Op. 92
3 Lieder, Op. 97
Trost, Op. 99
3 Lieder, Op. 106a
6 Lieder, Op. 110
Gesänge von Hölderlin, Op. 120
Lieder von C.F. Meyer, Op. 124
Lieder, Op. 125
Lieder, Op. 128
6 Lieder, Op. 131

External links
list of compositions (in german)

Senfter, Johanna